Frank Bult (30 April 1901 – 19 July 1963) was an Australian rules footballer who played with Footscray in the Victorian Football League (VFL).

Notes

External links 
		

1901 births
1963 deaths
Australian rules footballers from New South Wales
Western Bulldogs players
East Sydney Australian Football Club players
Footscray Football Club (VFA) players
Brunswick Football Club players
Australian rules footballers from Ballarat